Outkast is a 2001 Nigerian crime-drama film produced and directed by Chico Ejiro.

Plot
The movie involves a group of Nigerian sex workers who are deported from Italy. When they return to Lagos, they resort to violent crime and exploitation to make money.

Cast

 Lucinda Abazie
 Sandra Achums
 Percy Aigobojie
 Lilian Bach
 Bobby Ejike
 Saidi Balogun
 Jude Ezenwa

 Shan George
 Njideka Nnamani
 Lilian Nwosu
 Sola Sobowale
 Bob-Manuel Udokwu
 Francis Okonkwo
 Bukky Wright

See also
 List of Nigerian films of 2001

References

External links

2001 films
Nigerian crime drama films
2001 crime drama films
English-language Nigerian films
2000s English-language films
Films shot in Nigeria